In Ghost House Inn is a 2010 Indian Malayalam-language horror comedy film written, directed, and co-produced by Lal. Starring Mukesh, Siddique, Jagadish, Ashokan and Nedumudi Venu in the lead roles, the film is a sequel to 2 Harihar Nagar (2009) and In Harihar Nagar (1990). In the film, Thomas Kutty buys a haunted bungalow and convinces his friends to stay with him on the first night. The trouble begins when they actually see the ghost of the mistress who was killed seventy years ago.

It was produced by P. N. Venugopal under the banner of PNV Associates. The film was a box office success.

Plot 
The movie starts with the flashback of an incident which took place 70 years ago, in Dorothy bungalow, where Madam Dorothy Fernandez carries a trunk filled with blood (where she killed her husband and his lover) and kills her driver. She then drops the trunk and the driver into a well situated in the lower right room and leaves the place.

The story shifts to the present day, where Thomas Kutty (Ashokan) buys the bungalow in Ooty with the cash which he received in 2 Harihar Nagar, with the intent of converting it into a resort. The property is believed to be haunted by the ghost of the mistress who was killed 70 years ago. Thomas Kutty proves to his friends that these ghosts can be easily made by men, by keeping some men and women and disturbing Mahadevan, Govindan Kutty and Appukuttan in their sleep. He also tells them that he had stayed there many days before he bought the bungalow, all alone. The three agree to stay with Thomas Kutty in the bungalow and bring their wives along.

In the middle of the journey they see Father Dominic, who warns that the foursome are in the path of bad things. They do not pay heed to his words, but then the housekeepers employed by Thomas Kutty leave on the pretext of the house being haunted. At this point Thomas Kutty reveals that he had lied to the others about having stayed alone in the days before purchasing the bungalow. This revelation startles the four, who start fearing for their own and their wives' safety. After a series of unpleasant events, the four decide to apologise to Father Dominic and ask him for help.

Fr. Dominic accompanies the four to the house and attempts to exorcise the house. But things sour on their first meeting, when Dominic mentions he is in no way associated to any church and he is a person involved in paranormal activities. However, before the 2 leaves his house, he warns of a threat from fire to one of their spouse. This turns true, the same night, when Thomas Kutty's wife Jessy's dress catches fire, but she is rescued in the nick of time, and by Christopher, a doctor sent by Father Dominic.

Post this incident, the priest visit's the house, after his earlier advice to stay away from alcohol, meat and women is not followed by the friends, leaving Father Dominic injured in the left hand by an unknown force. Here things takes a bad turn, when the maid servant Marathagam gets possessed by the ghost. While exorcising the ghost, Father Dominic suffers a heart attack, and is declared dead. Thomas Kutty sells the house to Dorothy for half the price.

On their return journey, Mahadevan receives a call from Father Dominic, who says he faked his death. The Father reveals Dr. Christopher is his partner, Marathagam was actually one of his minions, who had a twin sister. However Mahadevan reveals that he realised Father Dominic was a fraud, when after his first encounter with the ghost in their house, Dominic bandaged his right hand instead of his left. Similarly Appukuttan reveals he knew the doctor had lied about his death, as he had checked his pulse. Govindan reveals they bribed the registrar with double the amount and he had revealed that Dorothy and Father Dominic are the same people. and as a final coup de grace, Thomas Kutty reveals they have the property and the amount he has the full amount he paid to Dorothy/Dominic for purchasing the property. The friends rejoice and head for Dorothy Bungalow.

As they get inside, the gates close on their own, indicating the presence of an entity.

Cast

Production 
Shooting for the film began in early October 2009. It was scripted and directed by Lal, who also wrote and directed the film's predecessors.

Soundtrack 
The film's soundtrack contains 6 songs, all composed by Alex Paul. Lyrics were by Bichu Thirumala, Anitha and Muthu Vijayam.

Release

Box office 
In Ghost House Inn was a commercial success at the box office. Made on a budget of 2.5 crore, it grossed 38 crore from the box office.

Critical reception 
Rediff.com gave it 2 out of 5 stars, saying: "There's nothing new about In Ghost House Inn... this third instalment comes without much of a story line compared to the earlier films". Sify wrote: "In Ghost House Inn manages to entertain the viewers to some extent". Indiaglitz wrote; "All in all In Ghost House Inn may find it little harder than its prequels to satisfy the ever demanding fans of the fantastic four". Similarly, Oneindia.com and Nowrunning.com gave average reviews to the film and gave it 2 out of 5 stars.
But Zonekerala.com gave the film 4 out of 5 stars: "The film has aptly made use of the resources available and is constructed at a modest budget. This movie is a must see for your family this season".

References

External links 
 
 In Ghost House Inn Review 

2010 films
2010 horror films
2010s Malayalam-language films
Indian haunted house films
Indian ghost films
Indian comedy horror films
Indian sequel films
Films shot in Ooty
Malayalam films remade in other languages
In3
Films directed by Lal